Henley-on-Thames railway station is a terminal railway station in the town of Henley-on-Thames in Oxfordshire, England. The station is on the Henley-on-Thames branch line that links the towns of Henley and Twyford.

It is served by local services operated by Great Western Railway.

The station has a single terminal platform, which is long enough to accommodate an eight coach train. There is a station building, with waiting area, ticket office and self-service ticket machines, together with a 280 space car park. The station is staffed in the mornings only, on Mondays to Saturdays.

History
The station was opened by the Great Western Railway on 1 June 1857. It had three platforms, mainly to serve the intensive service for Regatta traffic, for which purpose they were lengthened in 1891. The station was host to some eight berth GWR camp coaches in 1937, they were positioned here to provide accommodation for parties wishing to witness the coronation. These coaches were let at twice the normal hire rate for the week. Two camping coaches were positioned here by the Western Region in 1964. The original trainshed and station building, which were to the north of the present station, were removed in 1975 and the site sold. The platforms were reduced to two from 16 March 1969, and then to just one in 1986. The present building was erected in 1985 to serve the one remaining platform.

Other facilities at the station included a large goods yard (closed 7 September 1964), which is now the car park, a goods shed, signal box (closed 20 March 1972), engine shed (closed 5 October 1958), and turntable. These were progressively removed in the 1960s and 1970s. To the south of the station lay extensive sidings, used to stable extra trains during the regatta and at other times to store surplus coaches from as far away as Old Oak Common.

In popular culture
The station in its 1891 form appears in the closing scenes of the 1958 British film The Key.

Service

Trains operate every 30 minutes on all days of the week. During the morning and evening rush hours some services run through to/from London Paddington station, whilst a few off-peak trains run through to/from Reading station. At other times, passengers for Paddington and Reading must change at Twyford.

During the Henley Royal Regatta, held every July, a special timetable is operated with additional trains. During the period of the regatta, not all trains stop at Shiplake and Wargrave. Although the off-peak services use 2 coach trains and the peak time services to and from Paddington are usually no longer than 6 coaches, longer trains are run during the Regatta.

References

Bibliography

External links
 

Railway station
Railway stations in Oxfordshire
Former Great Western Railway stations
Railway stations in Great Britain opened in 1857
Railway stations served by Great Western Railway
1857 establishments in England